The Decoy class was a class of three cutters of the Royal Navy. William Rule designed the class. Two were lost in wartime; they grounded, enabling the French to capture them. One was lost to bad weather.

  participated in the capture of several small French privateers, captured or recaptured a number of merchant vessels, and captured a number of smuggling vessels. The French captured her in 1814.
  was wrecked on 3 March 1824.
  stranded on the French coast on 28 October, which enabled the French to capture her.

Citations and references
Citations

References
 
 

1810 ships
Cutters of the Royal Navy